The Another Story festival (tr. Druga Prikazna), is an annual three-day literary event, taking place in Skopje, Republic of North Macedonia.
The name of the festival refers to the idea of affirming the local and global faces of otherness in culture and literature.
At its inauguration in 2016, the festival's topic was ‘Literature and Activism’, and was inspired by the “Colorful Revolution” protests in the county.

Origin and history
The inauguration of the festival corresponded with the mass protests, organized by the civil sector in Macedonia, against alleged corruption within the country's political elite. The idea behind the festival is to "harvest" the creative energy from the street protests and transform them into artistic expressions of the desire for democratization and emancipation.
Another objective of the festival is to popularize literature and culture, both of which, according to the organizers, have been quite marginally maintained in the country due to a widespread poverty and poor cultural demand.

Themes

The phrase ‘Another Story’, selected as a name of the festival, aims at affirming the otherness in culture and literature, as well as of the many faces of local and global otherness. The main message of the Another Story Festival is tolerance and the desire to create another, different kind of Macedonia - one more open and accepting towards to diversity.

The main subject of Another Story is short fiction, however, the festival also covers hybrid literature forms, as literary forms that combine written word with music, graphics, media, theory, etc.

Guests
Every year the festival gives out a grand prize. In 2016 the winner was David Albahari, a renowned Serbian Jewish writer from Belgrade.

References

  "Скопски книжевен фестивал за мали фикции ДРУГА ПРИКАЗНА". Портал ОКНО. Скопје, Македонија. 14 јуни 2016 
  "Зошто Друга Приказна?". Official prospect for the festival. Templum publishing. SKopje, R. Macedonia. February 2016
  "Време е за Друга приказна". Centar News. 27 јуни 2016 
  "Стартува новиот скопски книжевен фестивал „Друга приказна“". B2 News. Јуни 2016 

Annual events in North Macedonia
Festivals in Skopje